1969 in sports describes the year's events in world sport.

Alpine skiing
 Alpine Skiing World Cup:
 Men's overall champion: Karl Schranz, Austria
 Women's overall champion: Gertrud Gabl, Austria

American football
 Super Bowl III: the New York Jets (AFL) won 16−7 over the Baltimore Colts (NFL)
 Location: Miami Orange Bowl
 Attendance: 75,389
 MVP: Joe Namath, QB (New York)
 Game note: Super Bowl is remembered for New York quarterback Joe Namath "guaranteeing" a victory.
 Rose Bowl (1968 season)
 The Ohio State Buckeyes won 27–16 over the Southern California Trojans to win the college football national championship
 College football's centennial year was marked by racial strife.
 September 28 – Minnesota Vikings' Quarterback Joe Kapp became the last player to throw seven touchdowns in a single game.
 November 22 – College Football – Michigan upsets #1 ranked Ohio State 24-12 sending Michigan to the Rose Bowl
 December 6 – College Football – #1 Texas beats #2 Arkansas 15–14 in the then Game of the Century.  Texas would remain #1 for the rest of the season and were the AP 1969 National Champions following their Cotton Bowl win.

Association football
 September 26 – the Bolivian soccer team is killed in a plane crash near La Paz, Bolivia
 European Cup – A.C. Milan 4–1 Ajax
 Inter-Cities Fairs Cup – Newcastle United defeat Újpesti Dózsa 6–2 on aggregate
 England – First Division Champions: Leeds United
 England – FA Cup – Manchester City won 1–0 over Leicester City
 Germany – Bundesliga – Bayern Munich
 Italy – Serie A: Fiorentina
 Scotland – First Division Champions: Celtic
 Scotland – FA Cup: Celtic won 4–0 over Rangers
 Spain – La Liga: Real Madrid
 Ecuador – Ecuadorian Serie A Champions: LDU Quito

Athletics
 September – 1969 European Championships in Athletics held in Athens

Australian rules football
 Victorian Football League
 April 12: Carlton become the first team to score 200 points in a VFL match when they kick 30.30 (210) to Hawthorn 12.10 (82). Alex Jesaulenko kicks 6.12 (48).
 Richmond wins the 73rd VFL Premiership (Richmond 12.13 (85) d Carlton 8.12 (60))
 Brownlow Medal awarded to Kevin Murray (Fitzroy)

Bandy

Baseball
 The American League expands to 12 teams, adding the adding the Kansas City Royals and Seattle Pilots, and the National League expands to 12 teams, adding the Montreal Expos and San Diego Padres.
 Due to expansion, Major League Baseball creates four divisions, with two in each league. 
 March 1 – Mickey Mantle of the New York Yankees announces his retirement.
 April 14 – Montreal Expos outfielder Mack Jones hit a three-run home run and two-run triple that highlighted an 8–7 win over the St. Louis Cardinals in the Expos' first home victory as a franchise at Jarry Park. Jones' blast was also the first MLB home run hit outside the United States.
 July 20 – San Francisco Giants pitcher Gaylord Perry, some six years after his manager quipped, "They'll put a man on the moon before he hits a home run", hits the first home run of his career just hours after Neil Armstrong lands on the moon.
 World Series – the New York Mets win 4 games to 1 over the Baltimore Orioles.

Basketball
 NCAA Men's Basketball Championship –
 UCLA wins 92–72 over Purdue
 NBA Finals –
 Boston Celtics won 4 games to 3 over the Los Angeles Lakers
 1969 ABA Finals –
 Oakland Oaks defeat Indiana Pacers 4 games to 1

Boxing
 June 23 – Joe Frazier scored a 7th-round TKO over Jerry Quarry.
 August 26 –  José Nápoles retained the World Welterweight Championship in a 15-round decision over Emile Griffith.
 August 31 – death of Rocky Marciano (45), Italian-American World Heavyweight boxing champion, in an air crash

Canadian football
 Grey Cup – Ottawa Rough Riders won 29–11 over the Saskatchewan Roughriders.
 Vanier Cup – Manitoba Bisons won 24–15 over the McGill Redmen

Cricket
 February 20 – Australia  defeat the West Indies at Sydney in the Fifth Test Match to win the series 3-1
 March 8 Rioting stops the final match of  England's tour of Pakistan on the third day. The match is abandoned and the series drawn.
 July 15 – England  defeat the West Indies at Headingley in the Third Test Match to win the series 2-0
 August 26 – England  defeat New Zealand  at The Oval in the Third Test Match to win the series 2-0
 Learie Constantine becomes the first cricketer and the first person of Afro-Caribbean descent to be given a life peerage.

Cycling
 Giro d'Italia won by Felice Gimondi of Italy
 Tour de France – Eddy Merckx of Belgium
 UCI Road World Championships – Men's road race – Harm Ottenbros of Netherlands

Figure skating
 World Figure Skating Championships –
 Men's champion: Tim Wood, United States
 Ladies' champion: Gabrielle Seyfert, Germany
 Pair skating champions:  Irina Rodnina & Alexei Ulanov, Soviet Union
 Ice dancing champions: Diane Towler & Bernard Ford, Great Britain

Golf
Men's professional
 Masters Tournament – George Archer
 U.S. Open – Orville Moody
 British Open – Tony Jacklin
 PGA Championship – Raymond Floyd
 PGA Tour money leader – Frank Beard – $164,707
 Ryder Cup – United States and Britain tied 16 all in team golf.
Men's amateur
 British Amateur – Michael Bonallack
 U.S. Amateur – Steve Melnyk
Women's professional
 LPGA Championship – Betsy Rawls
 U.S. Women's Open – Donna Caponi
 LPGA Tour money leader – Carol Mann – $49,152

Harness racing
 United States Pacing Triple Crown races –
 Cane Pace – Kat Byrd
 Little Brown Jug – Laverne Hanover
 Messenger Stakes – Bye Bye Sam
 Lindy's Pride won the United States Trotting Triple Crown races –
 Hambletonian – Lindy's Pride
 Yonkers Trot – Lindy's Pride
 Kentucky Futurity – Lindy's Pride
 Australian Inter Dominion Harness Racing Championship –
 Pacers: Richmond Lass

Horse racing
 February 11 – Diana Crump becomes first woman jockey to ride against men in USA racing
 February 22 – Barbara Jo Rubin becomes the first female winner of a USA race
Steeplechases
 Cheltenham Gold Cup – What A Myth
 Grand National – Highland Wedding
Flat races
 Australia – Melbourne Cup won by Rain Lover
 Canada – Queen's Plate won by Jumpin Joseph
 France – Prix de l'Arc de Triomphe won by Levmoss
 Ireland – Irish Derby Stakes won by Prince Regent
 English Triple Crown Races:
 2,000 Guineas Stakes – Right Tack
 The Derby – Blakeney
 St. Leger Stakes – Intermezzo
 United States Triple Crown Races:
 Kentucky Derby – Majestic Prince
 Preakness Stakes – Majestic Prince
 Belmont Stakes – Arts and Letters

Ice hockey
 Art Ross Trophy as the NHL's leading scorer during the regular season: Phil Esposito, Boston Bruins
 Hart Memorial Trophy – for the NHL's Most Valuable Player:  Phil Esposito, Boston Bruins
 Stanley Cup – Montreal Canadiens won 4 games to 0 over the St. Louis Blues
 World Hockey Championship
 Men's champion: Soviet Union defeated Sweden
 NCAA Men's Ice Hockey Championship – University of Denver Pioneers defeat Cornell University Big Red 4–3 in Colorado Springs, Colorado
Goalie Karen Koch is signed to a professional contract with the Marquette Iron Rangers to become the first woman to play professional hockey in North America, if not the world.

Motorsport

Rugby league
1969–70 European Rugby League Championship
1969 New Zealand rugby league season
1969 NSWRFL season
1968–69 Northern Rugby Football League season / 1969–70 Northern Rugby Football League season

Rugby union
 75th Five Nations Championship series is won by Wales

Snooker
 World Snooker Championship reverts to a knockout format. John Spencer beats Gary Owen 37-24

Tennis
 June 6 – death of Rafael Osuna, Mexican tennis player, in an air crash
 June 21 – death of Maureen Connolly (34), first winner of the women's Grand Slam
 Australian Rod Laver, one of only two men to ever win the Grand Slam in tennis wins it for the second time
 Grand Slam in tennis men's results:
 Australian Open – Rod Laver (Australia)
 French Open – Rod Laver
 Wimbledon championships – Rod Laver
 U.S. Open – Rod Laver
 Grand Slam in tennis women's results:
 Australian Open – Margaret Court
 French Open – Margaret Court
 Wimbledon championships – Ann Haydon-Jones
 U.S. Open – Margaret Court
 Davis Cup – United States wins 5–0 over Romania in world tennis.

Awards
 ABC's Wide World of Sports Athlete of the Year: Mario Andretti, race car driver
 Associated Press Male Athlete of the Year – Tom Seaver, Major League Baseball
 Associated Press Female Athlete of the Year – Debbie Meyer, Swimming

References

 
Sports by year